The MacRobert Award is regarded as the leading prize recognising UK innovation in engineering by corporations.  The winning team receives a gold medal and a cash sum of £50,000. 

The annual award process begins with an invitation to companies to submit entries, by the end of January. The judging panel for the awards, which includes several Fellows of the Royal Academy of Engineering, then selects a shortlist of six to eight candidates. Following site visits, the judges produce a shortlist of three or four candidates for visits by the whole judging panel.

The judges consider three key criteria when assessing entries: 

 Innovation 
 Commercial success
 Benefit to society

The guidance for submissions explains that "All three criteria may be interpreted broadly to reflect the very diverse nature of engineering and its role in every aspect of society". 

In 2019, the 50th anniversary year of the awards, Royal Mail issued a series of postage stamps marking "the marvels of British engineering", with a new set of 10 stamps that featured, along with other engineering achievements, three past winners of the MacRobert Award.

History
The award is named in honour of Rachel, Lady MacRobert (1884–1954). It was established in 1969 by the MacRobert Trust. In 1979 the Royal Academy of Engineering took on the administration, supported by the Worshipful Company of Engineers and industry sponsors.

The criteria for judging entries have changed over the years. The original remit was to reward “an outstanding contribution” made “by way of innovation in the fields of engineering or the other physical technologies or in the application of the physical sciences, which has enhanced or will enhance the national prestige and prosperity of the United Kingdom of Great Britain and Northern Ireland”. The first rule change was to include commercial success as a criterion. This was done to exclude entries that failed to have any lasting impact in the marketplace.

Winners

2021 - DNA Nudge

See also

 List of engineering awards

References

External links
 The MacRobert Award - Royal Academy of Engineering
 MacRobert Winners 1969-2015 - Royal Academy of Engineering
 MacRobert Award 2005 winner and finalists, Ingenia Magazine, June 2005
 MacRobert Award 2006 winner and finalists, Ingenia Magazine, June 2006
 MacRobert Award 2007 winner and finalists, Ingenia Magazine, June 2007
 MacRobert Award 2008 winner and finalists, Ingenia Magazine, June 2008

British science and technology awards
Awards of the Royal Academy of Engineering
Awards established in 1969